Taygetis mermeria, the mermeria wood nymph, is a species of butterfly of the family Nymphalidae. It is found throughout the Neotropical realm from Mexico to Bolivia. The habitat consists of rainforests and cloudforests.

Subspecies
Taygetis mermeria mermeria (Suriname, Bolivia, Brazil: Amazonas)
Taygetis mermeria excavata Butler, 1868 (Costa Rica, Panama, Honduras)
Taygetis mermeria griseomarginata Miller, 1978 (Mexico)

References

Butterflies described in 1776
Euptychiina
Fauna of Brazil
Nymphalidae of South America
Taxa named by Pieter Cramer